John de Havilland (17 October 1918 – 23 August 1943) was a British test pilot.

John and his brothers, Geoffrey de Havilland Jr. and Peter, were sons of Geoffrey de Havilland, the famous designer and manufacturer. All three brothers were pilots and flew as test pilots for the de Havilland company. John had been a sergeant in the Royal Air Force Volunteer Reserve (RAFVR) prior to the Second World War. Due to the demands for pilots in the de Havilland company, he was released from service and joined his father's firm.

During a test flight of a de Havilland Mosquito Mark VI, flying with flight test observer John H. F. Scrope, he collided in the vicinity of St Albans with another Mosquito Mark VI flown by pilot George Gibbins. Both aircraft disintegrated in the air, killing all four occupants aboard. Godfrey J. Carter was flying as an observer in Gibbins's aircraft.

The John de Havilland Scholarship Fund was set up by Geoffrey de Havilland after his son's death. The award is associated with the aviation industry and its purpose is to develop the industry by recognising exceptional young people who will enter the profession.

References

External links

"1943 | 2145 | Flight Archive." flightglobal.com. Retrieved: 20 August 2009.
. worldroots.com. Retrieved: 20 August 2009.

1918 births
1943 deaths
Aviators killed in aviation accidents or incidents in England
De Havilland
John
English aviators
Royal Air Force airmen
English test pilots
People from Edgware
Victims of aviation accidents or incidents in 1943